Futebol Clube do Porto, commonly known as Porto, is a Brazilian football club based in Porto União, Santa Catarina state.

Achievements
 Campeonato Catarinense Third Level:
 Winners (1): 2008

Stadium
Futebol Clube do Porto play their home games at Estádio Municipal Antiocho Pereira. The stadium has a maximum capacity of 12,000 people.

References

Association football clubs established in 1999
Football clubs in Santa Catarina (state)
1999 establishments in Brazil